David Richard Seaborne Davies (26 June 1904 – 26 October 1984) was a Welsh law teacher who served briefly as a Liberal Party Member of Parliament (MP).

Early life 
Davies was born in Pwllheli, and attended the local grammar school followed by University College, Aberystwyth. He went on to St John's College, Oxford.

Political career 
When David Lloyd George was given a Peerage after 55 years representing Caernarvon Boroughs, Davies was chosen as the Liberal Party candidate to follow him. He faced a contest against Plaid Cymru but won the byelection, taking his seat just as the Second World War was coming to an end in Europe.

Unfortunately for Davies, the end of the war brought a swift dissolution to Parliament and he lost his seat to the Conservative Party in the 1945 general election. He had one of the shortest tenures as a Member of Parliament during the Twentieth Century, in contrast to his predecessor who was one of the longest of all time.

Later life 
After his defeat, Davies was appointed to the Chair of Common Law in the Faculty of Law at the University of Liverpool. He was also Warden of Derby Hall. This position allowed him to take several public appointments, including as a member of the Criminal Law Revision Committee where his advice in relation to the law of dishonesty led to a significant reform in the Theft Act 1968.

His academic position also helped him to publish significant works on the history of patents, and he was President of the Society of Public Teachers of Law in 1960–61. In 1962 he was the Cooley Lecturer at the University of Michigan. Within Liverpool University he was Public Orator from 1950 to 1955, and Pro-Vice-Chancellor from 1956 to 1960. The Faculty of Law building at Liverpool was largely built at his instigation.

After retirement in 1971, Davies moved to Caernarfon where he indulged his interest in Rugby union (he had been Life President of Liverpool University Rugby Football Club and Vice President of London Welsh RFC, and became President of Pwllheli Sports Club for ten years. He served as a Magistrate in both Liverpool and Caernarfon, and was High Sheriff of Caernarvonshire in 1967–68.

Davies was a great after-dinner speaker, regaling his audience with a large fund of Welsh anecdotes suitable for any audience. He was also interested in Welsh culture and was President of the National Eisteddfod of Wales in 1955, 1973 and 1975.

See also 
List of United Kingdom MPs with the shortest service
UK by-election records

References 

 "Prof Seaborne Davies" (Obituary), The Times, 5 November 1984, p. 16.
 M. Stenton and S. Lees, "Who's Who of British MPs" vol. III (Harvester Press, 1979)

External links 

1904 births
1984 deaths
Liberal Party (UK) MPs for Welsh constituencies
UK MPs 1935–1945
Alumni of Aberystwyth University
Alumni of St John's College, Oxford
Academics of the University of Liverpool
High Sheriffs of Caernarvonshire
Presidents of the National Eisteddfod of Wales
Members of Parliament for Caernarfon